In the context of European integration, Europeanisation of law may be interpreted as
 broadening of the scope of European law,
 emergence of new legal disciplines in Europe.

According to Professor Jacques Ziller the Europeanisation of law has three main consequences: 
 leads to change in the systems of sources of law in the national legal systems, 
 legal systems converge,
 changes legal sciences' methodology.

See also 
Caselex
European Union law
Harmonisation of law

External links 
Integration and the Europeanisation of the Law
The Europeanisation of national legal systems: some consequences for legal thinking in civil law countries

Sources 
 Ziller, Jacques: Europeanisation of Law: From the Enlargement of the Areas of European Law to a Transformation of the Law of the Member States (L'Européisation Du Droit: De L'Élargissement Des Champs Du Droit De L'Union Européenne À Une Transformation Des Droits Des États Membres), EUI Working Paper LAW No. 2006/19, July 2006

European Union legal terminology